María del Socorro Patricia Acevedo Limón (born April 19, 1959, in Mexico City), better known as Patricia Acevedo, is a Mexican actress and director. She was the voice of Sailor Moon in the Mexican/Latin American version, and is arguably among the most popular Usagi actresses. Her voice is easy to distinguish due to its gentle soprano tone, which remains even if she voices a colder or evil character (i.e. Cobalt in Fight! Iczer-One).

Voice acting career

Animation 
Sailor Moon / Serena Tsukino / Usagi Tsukino in Sailor Moon and Sailor Moon Crystal.
Lisa Simpson, from the Latin American version of The Simpsons 1990–2005.
Additional voices in Cowboy Bebop: La Película
Akane Tendo in the Ranma ½ films (Nihao My Concubine and Big Trouble in Nekonron, China)
Asuka Tenjouin/Alexis Rhodes in Yu-Gi-Oh! GX (Episodes 15–52)
Ayame (InuYasha)
Misa Hayase/Lisa Hayes, Sammie Porter, Nova Satori, Annie LaBelle from the three Robotech Generations
Angelica Pickles, Rugrats and All Grown Up!, as well as The Rugrats Movie and Rugrats in Paris: The Movie.
Aiko Date in Hajime no Ippo
Chi-Chi (although the character's name was changed to "Milk") and Chaozu in Dragon Ball Z
Iron Maiden Jeanne in Shaman King
Cobalt in Fight! Iczer-One
Etsumi Kido in Mirumo
Casper, from the Latin American version (her debut role)
Oakley in Pokémon Heroes
Rosa and Princess Deena in the 2001 version of Cyborg 009
Tiger Lily in The Adventures of Peter PanReina Emeralda in Capitán Raymar and Arcadia de Mis Jovenes Años
La Princesa Adora/She-Ra in She-Ra: Princesa De Poder
Gabby in My Little Pony
Charlene Sinclair in Dinosaurs
Vicky in Jimmy Timmy Power Hour
Swamee Princess in Hans Christian Andersen's The Little Mermaid
Nodoka Miyazaki in Negima! Magister Negi Magi (Spanish Version)
Reina Merla - Queen Merla in Voltron (Spanish Version)
Patti Mayonnaise in Doug (Nickelodeon episodes)
Kuki Sanban and Maggie (the future Madame Margaret) in Codename: Kids Next Door
Kitty in Kitty Is Not a Cat
Granmami Aves/Lady Gobbler in El Tigre: The Adventures of Manny Rivera

 Live action 
 Violet Beauregarde (voiceover for Denise Nickerson) in Willy Wonka and the Chocolate Factory (1971) (1984 redub) 
Nora (voiceover for Helen Reddy) in Pedro y el Dragón Elliot (1977) (her full-length feature film''' debut)
Major Margaret "Hot Lips" Houlihan (voiceover for Sally Kellerman) in M*A*S*H (1978)
Lady Oscar (voiceover for Catriona MacColl) in Lady Oscar (1979)
Dra. Kate McCrae (voiceover for Yvette Mimieux) in El Agujero Negro (1979)
Lt. Commandante (Dra.) Christine Chapel (voiceover for Majel Barrett) in Viaje a las Estrellas: La Película (1979)
Dale Arden (voiceover for Melody Anderson) in Flash Gordon (1980)
Stella Summers (voiceover for Julie Budd) in El Diablo y Max Devlin (1981)
Marion Ravenwood (voiceover for Karen Allen) in Los Cazadores del Arca Perdida (1981)
Natalia (voiceover for Barbara Carrera) in Condorman (1981)
Lora/Yori (voiceover for Cindy Morgan) in Tron (1982)
Chalmers (voiceover for Andrea Marcovicci) in Spacehunter: Adventures in the Forbidden Zone (1983)
J.C. Walenski (voiceover for Ally Sheedy) in Bad Boys (1983)
Jennifer Katherine Mack (voiceover for Ally Sheedy) in Juegos de Guerra (1983)
Cherry Valance (voiceover for Diane Lane) in The Outsiders (1983)
Kara Zor-El/Linda Lee/Supergirl (voiceover for Helen Slater) in Superchica (1984)
Sarah Connor (voiceover for Linda Hamilton) in The Terminator (1984) and Terminator 2: El Juicio Final (1991)
Wann Li/Shorty (voiceover for Ke Huy Quan) in Indiana Jones y el Templo de la Perdición (1984)
Julia (voiceover for Suzanna Hamilton) in 1984 (1984)
Allison Reynolds (voiceover for Ally Sheedy) in El Club de los Cinco (1985)
Ellen Ripley (voiceover for Sigourney Weaver) in Aliens (1986) (director's cut version)
Dra. Christine Chapel (voiceover for Majel Barrett) in Viaje a las Estrellas IV: Misión: Salvar la Tierra (1986)
Epiphany Proudfoot (voiceover for Lisa Bonet) in Corazón Satánico (1987)
Katya Yarno (voiceover for Diane Lane) in Lady Beware (1987)
Jessie Montgomery (voiceover for Ally Sheedy) in Maid to Order (1987)
Cécile de Volanges (voiceover for Uma Thurman) in Dangerous Liaisons (1988)
Teri (voiceover for Victoria Jackson) in Los Telelocos (1989)
Buckwheat and Miss Roberts (voiceover for Ross Bagley and Lea Thompson) in The Little Rascals (1994)
Casper (voice dubbing for Malachi Pearson and voiceover for Devon Sawa) in the live adaptation of Casper (1995)
Gloria Capulet (voiceover for Diane Venona) in William Shakespeare's Romeo & Julieta (1996)
Velma Dinkley (voiceover for Linda Cardellini) in Scooby-Doo (2002)
Grace Connelly (voiceover for Jennifer Aniston) in Bruce Almighty (2003) (DVD universal version)
Alex (voiceover for Rose Byrne) in Wicker Park (2004)
Jack Starbright (voiceover for Alicia Silverstone) in Alex Rider: Operation Stormbreaker (2004)
Velma Dinkley (voiceover for Linda Cardellini) in Scooby-Doo 2: Monstruos Sueltos (2004)
Veronica Bell (voiceover for Brooke D'Orsay) in The Skulls III (2004)
Joanne (voiceover for Mena Suvari) in Beauty Shop (2005)
Bryony (voiceover for Michelle Duncan) in Driving Lessons (2006)
Janey (voiceover for Ginnifer Goodwin) in In the Land of Women (2007)
Chispita (voiceover for Paulie Kitt) in Meteoro (2008)
Marion Ravenwood (voiceover for Karen Allen) in Indiana Jones y el Reino de la Calavera de Cristal (2008).
Sarah Connor (voiceover for Linda Hamilton) in Terminator: La Salvación (2009)
Alice Cullen (voiceover for Ashley Greene) in The Twilight Saga: New Moon (2009) (re-dubbed version)
Beth Murphy (voiceover for Jennifer Aniston) in He's Just Not That Into You (2009) (Videomax version)
LN (voiceover for Maggie Gyllenhaal) in Away We Go (2009)
Nicole (voiceover for Emily Mortimer) in The Pink Panther 2 (2009)

 Live-action TV 
Rachel Green in Friends (1994–2004)
Tabitha in Bewitched (1966–1972)
Laura Ingalls (voiceover for Melissa Gilbert) in La Familia Ingalls (1974–1980)
Dra. Marlena Evans (voiceover for Deidre Hall) in Dias de Nuestras Vidas (1976–1987; 1991-)
Hester Prynne (voiceover for Meg Foster) in La Letra Escarlata (1979)
Julie Preston (voiceover for Susan Dey) in Sunset Limousine (1983)
Major Margaret "Hot Lips" Houlihan (voiceover for Loretta Swit) in M*A*S*H (1984–1995)
Computer voice in Viaje a las Estrellas: La Nueva Generación (1987–1994)
Kate Monday (voiceover for Beverly Leech) in Mathnet (1987–1989)
Computer voice in Viaje a las Estrellas: Estación Espacial 9 (1993–1999)
Computer voice in Viaje a las Estrellas: Voyager (1995–2001)
Keiko in ZOOM (1999–2000)
Brian Tanner in ALF (1986–1990)
Kimberly McIntyre (Jessica Lucas) in 90210 (2008) 4 episodes

 Director credits Lady Oscar (1979)Sailor Moon'' (1996–1999)

Notes

1959 births
Living people
Mexican voice actresses
20th-century Mexican actresses
21st-century Mexican actresses
Mexican actresses
Mexican voice directors